Hamerton is an English surname. Notable people with this surname include the following:

 Atkins Hamerton (1804–1857), British consul in Zanzibar
 Bob Hamerton (1911–1990), Canadian swimmer
 Greg Hamerton (born 1973), South African fantasy novelist and extreme sports writer
 John Miller Hamerton (1778–1855), British Army officer
 Philip Gilbert Hamerton (1834–1894), British art critic and writer
 Robert Hamerton-Kelly (1938–2013), South African Christian theologian, United Methodist pastor and author

English-language surnames